is a Japanese track and field sprinter and hurdler, who specializes in the 400 metres sprint and 400 metres hurdles. She competed for her country as part of the Japanese women's 4 × 400 metres relay team at the Summer Olympics in 2008 and the World Championships in Athletics three times (2007, 2009, 2015). She has been a four-time medallist in the relay at the Asian Athletics Championships (2007, 2011, 2013, 2017), including a gold medal in 2011. She won her first major international medal in the hurdles – a bronze – at the 2017 Asian Athletics Championships.

Aoki competed for the women's 4 × 400 m relay at the 2008 Summer Olympics in Beijing, along with her teammates Mayu Kida, Satomi Kubokura, and Asami Tanno. She ran on the anchor leg of the first heat, with an individual-split time of 52.64 seconds. Aoki and her team finished the relay in last place for a seasonal best time of 3:30.52, failing to advance into the final.

Born in Gifu Prefecture, she attended Fukushima University and represented her country as a student-athlete at the 2007 Universiade.

International competitions

References

External links
 
 NBC 2008 Olympics profile
 JAAF profile 

1986 births
Living people
Sportspeople from Gifu Prefecture
Japanese female sprinters
Japanese female hurdlers
Olympic athletes of Japan
Athletes (track and field) at the 2008 Summer Olympics
Asian Games competitors for Japan
Athletes (track and field) at the 2010 Asian Games
World Athletics Championships athletes for Japan
Japan Championships in Athletics winners
Fukushima University alumni
20th-century Japanese women
21st-century Japanese women